The 2021–22 Coupe de France preliminary rounds, Centre-Val de Loire was the qualifying competition to decide which teams from the leagues of the Centre-Val de Loire region of France took part in the main competition from the seventh round.

A total of six teams qualified from the Centre-Val de Loire preliminary rounds. In 2020–21, SO Romorantin progressed furthest in the main competition, reaching the round of 32 before losing to Voltigeurs de Châteaubriant.

Draws and fixtures
On 15 July 2021, the league published the draw for the first three rounds of the competition, the preliminary round, first round and second round. A total of 244 teams from the region entered the competition. 50 teams from District 3 and District 4 levels entered in the preliminary round, with a single District 3 team exempted to the first round. The 84 remaining District level teams entered at the first round stage. 67 teams from the Régional leagues entered at the second round stage. The 10 Championnat National 3 teams entered at the third round stage, the 6 Championnat National 2 teams entered at the fourth round stage, the 2 Championnat National teams entered at the fifth round stage.

The third round draw was published on 7 September 2021. The fourth round draw was published on 21 September 2021. The fifth round draw was published on 5 October 2021. The sixth round draw was made on 19 October 2021.

Preliminary round
These matches were played on 29 August 2021.

First round
These matches were played on 28 and 29 August and 5 September 2021.

Second round
These matches were played on 4, 5 and 12 September 2021.

Third round
These matches were played on 18 and 19 September 2021.

Fourth round
These matches were played on 2 and 3 October 2021.

Fifth round
These matches were played on 16 and 17 October 2021.

Sixth round
These matches were played on 30 and 31 October 2021.

References

Preliminary rounds